3-Penten-2-one is an organic compound with the formula CH3C(O)CH=CHCH3. It exists as (E) and (Z) stereoisomers.  The compound is classified as an α,β-unsaturated ketone.  It is a colorless volatile liquid with fruity to pungent odor.

Preparation, occurrence, uses
The (E) isomer is classically obtained from the 3-chloropentanone by dehydrohalogenation.  It can also be obtained by dehydration of 4-hydroxy-pentan-2-one using oxalic acid as a catalyst.

3-Penten-2-one occurs naturally in the berries of two species of Aronia melanocarpa. It has also been found in other plants and foods such as tomatoes, cocoa, tea, and potato chips.

3-Penten-2-one can be used for the synthesis of other compounds such as the alkaloids senepodine G and cermizine C, for example. It is also a useful flavoring agent.

References 

Enones